James Tangatenga was an Anglican bishop in Malawi: he was Bishop of Southern Malawi from 1998 to 2013. 

After his time as bishop, Tangetenga was  offered the post of Dean of the William Jewett Tucker Foundation at Dartmouth College. but the appointment was rescinded because of Tangatenga's homophobia.

References

Anglican bishops of Southern Malawi
21st-century Anglican bishops in Malawi
20th-century Anglican bishops in Malawi